RadiciGroup is an Italian corporation with a network of production and sales sites located in Europe, North America, South America and Asia. RadiciGroup is one of the world’s leading producers of a wide range of chemical intermediates, polyamide polymers, engineering plastics, synthetic fibres and nonwovens.

The headquarters of the Group remain in Bergamo (Italy), specifically in Gandino, where back in 1941 the founder Pietro Radici established the first textile company. Across generations the solid family tradition has into the secret of the Group’s international success.

Since 2018, the company has been one of the main sponsors of Bergamo-based football club Atalanta.

Production chain

RadiciGroup manages diversified businesses worldwide focused on chemicals, plastics and synthetic fibres with total control over its production chain, from products such as adipic acid, polyamide 6 and polyamide 6.6 to yarns and engineering plastics. This control constitutes one of RadiciGroup's key strengths.

In the chemicals  sector the main products are:
PA 6 and PA 66 polymers
adipic acid, nitric acid
hexamethylenediamine
66 salt
AGS dicarboxylic acid mixture and dicarboxylic acid esters

In the plastics  sector the main products are:
PA6 and PA 66 Engineering Plastics
PA6 and PA 66 copolymers, PA610, PA510, PA612
PBT (Polybutylene terephthalate)
TPEs (Thermoplastic elastomers)
POM (Polyoxymethylene)

In the fibres sector the main products are:
PA6, PA66, PA610, PA612, PA510 yarns 
Polyester yarns
PBT – PTT – PP yarns
PA6 High Tenacity Yarns
PA66 High Tenacity Yarns 
Textile Tire and Rubber Reinforcement Materials (PA6, PA66, PET, Aramide, Rayon & Hybrids)
Acrylic Staple fiber, tow and Top.
Spun bond, PP, PE and PA yarns for artificial grass and synthetic turf

Some applications of fibres include: apparel, home furnishings and automotive interiors, residential and automotive use, tailor-made products for automotive applications, such as tyre cord, airbags, filters, hoses and belts.

RadiciGroup's products are exported all over the world, and are the starting point for developments in the clothing, sport, furnishings, automotive, electrical/electronic and appliances sectors.

History and acquisitions

In the 1980s Radici Chimica S.p.A. came into being following the purchase of an ex-Montedison production site in Novara.

In 2011 RadiciGroup acquired the German dorix GmbH (formerly Selbitzer Chemiefaser GmbH, founded in 1896 under the name of Heinrich Reinhold GmbH & Co. KG), based in Selbitz – Hochfranken, Bavaria. dorix GmbH is the European leader in the production of PA6 staple (dorix®) and PP staple products (reilen).

Sustainability

Accountability, transparency and ethical conduct: these are the cornerstones of the RadiciGroup Sustainability Policy. Sustainable development and corporate social responsibility are the goals of the Group’s business activities, day in and day out. Every year there is a new edition of the Sustainability Report according to the GRI method.

The Group follows the Responsible Care program, a valuable tool that provides the necessary inputs in order to achieve continual, significant and tangible improvements, especially when it forces a company to find and recognize its limitations.

RadiciGroup, to confirm once again its commitment to sustainability, in 2008 pre-registered with REACH regulation authority.

References

External links 
Global site

Textile companies of Italy
Chemical companies of Italy
Chemical companies established in 1941
Italian brands
Province of Bergamo
Companies based in Lombardy
Italian companies established in 1941